Festuca ovina, sheep's fescue or sheep fescue, is a species of grass. It is sometimes confused with hard fescue (Festuca trachyphylla).

General description
It is a perennial plant sometimes found in acidic ground, and in mountain pasture, throughout Europe (with the exception of some Mediterranean areas) and eastwards across much of Asia; it has also been introduced to North America.

It is one of the defining species of the British NVC community CG2, i.e. Festuca ovina – Avenula pratensis grassland, one of the calcicolous grassland communities. However, the species has a wide ecological tolerance in the UK, occurring on both basic and acid soils, as well as old mining sites and spoil heaps that are contaminated with heavy metals.

Sheep's fescue is a densely tufted perennial grass. Its greyish-green leaves are short and bristle-like. The panicles are both slightly feathery and a bit one-sided. It flowers from May until June, and is wind-pollinated. It has no rhizomes.

Sheep's fescue is a drought-resistant grass, commonly found on poor, well-drained mineral soil. It is sometimes used as a drought-tolerant lawn grass.
 
The great ability to adapt to poor soils is due to mycorrhizal fungi, which increase the absorption of water and nutrients and also are potential determinants of plant community structure. The symbiosis with fungi increases mineral, nitrogen and phosphate absorption, thanks to fungal hyphae that expand deeply in the soil and cover plant roots, increasing the exchange surface. The symbiosis also makes every plant interconnected with the surrounding plants, making possible the exchange of nutrients between plants far from each other.

More colourful garden varieties with blue-grey foliage are available.

Wildlife value
See also List of Lepidoptera that feed on grasses
This is one of the food plants for the caterpillars of several butterflies and moths, including the gatekeeper and the meadow brown, the small heath, and the grass moth Agriphila inquinatella.

Photos

Illustrations

References

ovina
Grasses of Asia
Grasses of Europe
Grasses of China
Grasses of Russia
Flora of Central Asia
Flora of Eastern Europe
Flora of Northeast Asia
Flora of Western Asia
Plants described in 1753
Taxa named by Carl Linnaeus
Fodder
Garden plants of Asia
Garden plants of Europe
Lawn grasses
Groundcovers